James Pulman   (bapt. 4 June 1783 – 29 October 1859) was an English officer of arms.

Pulman was born in Ottery St Mary, Devon, the son of Thomas and Susannah Pulman. In 1820, married Harriet May Walker, who died 22 April 1828. They had two sons, James Heard Pulman (1821–1900), a barrister who served as House of Lords Librarian, and Thomas Walter Pulman (1822–1897).

Pulman held the offices of Portcullis Pursuivant (1822–1838), Richmond Herald (1838–1846), Norroy King of Arms (1846–1848), and Clarenceux King of Arms (1848–1859). He was also Yeoman Usher of the Black Rod at the time of his death.

He was elected a Fellow of the Society of Antiquaries in 1812.

Pulman died at his home in East Hill, Wandsworth, aged 76.

References

1783 births
1859 deaths
English officers of arms
People from Ottery St Mary
Fellows of the Society of Antiquaries of London